Watch the Fireworks is the debut studio album by Scottish singer-songwriter Emma Pollock, released on 17 September 2007 by 4AD.

Track listing

Singles
Adrenaline ( 7" – May 28, 2007)
Adrenaline – 5:01
A Glorious Day – 3:21 (from a poem by Brendan Cleary)

Acid Test (CD & 7" – September 3, 2007)
Acid Test – 3:52
A Temporary Fix – 4:17

Paper and Glue (CD & 7" – November 26, 2007)
Paper and Glue – 3:45
I Have a Double – 4:48

References

External links

2007 debut albums
Emma Pollock albums
4AD albums
Albums produced by Victor Van Vugt